Old Kandahar (locally known as Zorr Shaar; , also Shahr-i-Kona in Dari) is a historical section of the city of Kandahar in southern Afghanistan. Many believe that there are hidden ancient treasures buried in and around the orange citadel.

The citadel
It is widely believed that after conquering Mundigak in 330 BC, Alexander the Great marched southeast with his army and laid out what is now Old Kandahar and named it Alexandria. The site was likely chosen as a way to protect its inhabitant from the occasional heavy sandstorms coming from nearby Reg District (Sand District). Others suggest that the foundation of the citadel was probably laid out during the Iron Age, and became a major fortress of the Achaemenid Empire. It served as the local seat of power for many rulers in the last 2,000 years. The region became part of many empires, including the Mauryans (322 BC–185 BC), Indo-Scythians (200 BC–400 AD), Sassanids, Arabs, Zunbils, Saffarids, Ghaznavids, Ghorids, Timurids, Mughals, Safavids, Hotaks, and the Durranis. It was one of the main cities of Arachosia, a historical region sitting in Greater Iran's southeastern lands and was also in contact with the Indus Valley civilization. The city has been a frequent target for conquest because of its strategic location in Southern Asia and Central Asia, controlling the main trade route linking the Indian subcontinent with the Middle East, the rest of Central Asia and the Persian Gulf.

The city was often fought over by the Safavids and the Mughals until 1709, when Mirwais Hotak made the region an independent kingdom and turned Kandahar into the capital of the Hotak dynasty. The city was destroyed by Nader Shah in 1738 after defeating Hussain Hotak, the last Hotak ruler. After the destruction of this old city all the remaining inhabitants were relocated to a nearby area which became known as "Naderabad" for a short time, named after Nader Shah. By 1750, Ahmad Shah Durrani had laid out the current city of Kandahar and turned it into the capital of his Durrani Empire.

Epigraphical discoveries
Important inscriptions in Greek, dating to the 3rd-2nd century BCE were discovered in or around the site of Old Kandahar, including the Kandahar Greek Edicts of Ashoka, the Kandahar Bilingual Rock Inscription also from the time of the Indian ruler Ashoka, and the Kandahar Sophytos Inscription.

See also
Kandahar
Kandahar Province

References

External links

 (a short documentary in Pashto language)

Kandahar
History of Kandahar
Populated places established in the 4th century BC
330s BC establishments
Populated places in Kandahar Province
Cities founded by Alexander the Great
Populated places along the Silk Road
Cities in Central Asia
Bazaars